Syllepte philetalis is a moth in the family Crambidae. It was described by Francis Walker in 1859. It is found in Brazil (Santarém, Amazonas).

References

Moths described in 1859
philetalis
Moths of South America